Walter Messa (born 16 May 1939) is an Italian diver. He competed in the men's 3 metre springboard event at the 1960 Summer Olympics.

References

External links
 
 

1939 births
Living people
Italian male divers
Olympic divers of Italy
Divers at the 1960 Summer Olympics
Divers from Milan
20th-century Italian people
21st-century Italian people